Meja Mwangi (born 27 December 1948) is a Kenyan writer.
He has worked in the film industry, including in screenwriting, assistant directing, and casting.

Biography
Mwangi was born David Dominic Mwangi in Nanyuki, Kenya, and was educated at Nanyuki Secondary School, Kenyatta College, and briefly at the University of Leeds. He then worked for the French Broadcasting Corporation doing odd jobs and the British Council in Nairobi as Visual Aids Officer, before turning to writing full-time. He was Fellow in Writing at the University of Iowa (1975–76).

After a prolonged period on the Kenyan and African publishing scene, Mwangi moved to the US after gaining international recognition and winning several awards.

His best-known early work includes the novels Kill Me Quick (1973), Going Down River Road (1976), and The Cockroach Dance (1979), which illustrate the urban landscapes of Kenya, the struggle against poverty, and the AIDS epidemic.

Prizes and awards

For general readers
Jomo Kenyatta Prize for Literature for Kill Me Quick (1974 - English winner); The Last Plague (2001 - English winner); Boy Gift (2007 - English Youth third place); Big Chief (2009 - English Adult Fiction third place). 
Lotus Prize for Literature (1978) presented by the Afro-Asian Writers' Association (aka Association of Asian and African Writers)

For juvenile readers
Deutscher Jugendliteraturpreis (German Youth Literature Prize), for Kariuki und sein weißer Freund. Eine Erzählung aus Kenia (Little White Man (1990), title changed to The Mzungu Boy (1992))
Le Prix Lire au College for Kariuki (1992)
American Library Association (USA) Notable Children's Books Award for Older Readers, The Mzungu Boy (2006)

Shortlist
Noma Award (Honourable mention), for Bread of Sorrow (1989)
International Dublin Literary Award (Nomination), for The Last Plague (2002)

Literary works

In English

 Adapted for the film "Cry Freedom".

Translations

Theatre, screenplays, other adaptations

 (adaptation of The Big Chiefs - 2007)
 (adaptation of Mama Dudu, the Insect Woman - 2007)

Filmography

References

External links
Official website

1948 births
Living people
Kenyan writers
International Writing Program alumni
Kenyan screenwriters
People from Laikipia County